Simeon Ivanov (born 31 March 1988) is a Bulgarian former professional racing driver. He competed in Formula Renault 2.0 and World Series by Renault in 2007. His racing career started at the age of 15 (2003). He won both the Bulgarian Karting Championship in 2005 and twice the South East European Karting Championship in 2004 and 2005. He was also promoted twice the Best Bulgarian Racing Driver award in the two years in which he raced in national championships. In 2014 he raced in the Bulgarian Rally and Rallysprint Championships. In 2015 he competed in GT4 Euroseries with Ginetta G50. He authored the book 0.1%: Join The Club of The Richest, Healthiest, Happiest.

Career

Karting
Ivanov started his karting career at the age of 15. He won his first podium in his first race and the first win only two races later. In 2004 (his first full year as a racing driver) he raced in two karting championships - Bulgarian and South East European. He became the first karting champion of South East Europe and got second place in the national championship in class KF2. At the end of the season all racing teams voted Simeon Ivanov to become the holder of the Best Racing Driver award.

2005 was even more successful for the Bulgarian pilot. He completed a total of 14 races in the Bulgarian Karting Championship and the South East European Championship, scoring 12 pole positions, 13 wins and one 2nd position. He won both Championship titles and was again promoted for the Best Bulgarian Racing Driver. In the end of the year, Ivanov toke part in the Kerpen Winter Cup, Germany. He raced partnered by CRG Holland team. After finishing 4th and 2nd in the two semifinals, he was pushed off the racing track at the final but still managed to get to the podium in fifth place.

In 2006 Simeon raced together with CRG Holland in the Italian Open Masters and at the Lonato Winter Cup. The top result of the season was reaching the finals at the Lonato race out of 140 racing drivers. At the end of the year, Ivanov made his first Formula Renault 2.0 test.

Formula Renault 2.0
After completing tests for CO2 Racing and Prema Powerteam during the winter season, Simeon Ivanov finally signed a contract with BVM Minardi to race a complete 2007 season in Formula Renault 2.0 Italian Championship and 3 races in Formula Renault 2.0 European Championship.

Formula Renault 3.5
After the end of the 2007 season, Simeon Ivanov signed a contract with Prema Powerteam to take part in the World Series by Renault official testing days at the Circuit Paul Ricard.

After the tests in Paul Ricard, Simeon decided to put an end on his racing career. He moved on to complete a Business Management degree from Kingston University London.

Personal life
Ivanov married Teodora Burgazlieva in 2017. They have two kids: Ryan and Emma.

References

External links

 

Bulgarian racing drivers
Sportspeople from Varna, Bulgaria
Living people
1988 births
BVM Racing drivers
Italian Formula Renault 2.0 drivers
Formula Renault Eurocup drivers